Piotr Fergusson Tepper (1713–1794) was a Polish banker of German burgher origin, merchant and industrial entrepreneur.

Piotr Fergusson Tepper of Warsaw was the wealthiest banker in the second half of 18th century Poland. Tepper was the owner of a trading house and of landed estates in Mazovia and Volhynia. The principal lender of King Stanisław August Poniatowski and of the Treasury of the Polish–Lithuanian Commonwealth, in 1793 Tepper became bankrupt, along with several other Polish banks. Piotr Fergusson Tepper was fatally wounded during disturbances at the time of the Kościuszko Insurrection, after his trading and banking house at Miodowa Street was plundered. He is buried at Powązki Evangelical Cemetery in Warsaw.

References 

Polish bankers
1713 births
1794 deaths
Burials at Powązki Cemetery
18th-century Polish–Lithuanian businesspeople